Eluru district is a district in coastal Andhra Region in  the Indian state of Andhra Pradesh. With Eluru as its administrative headquarters, it was proposed on 26 January 2022 to become one of the resultant twenty six districts in the state once a final notification is issued by the government of Andhra Pradesh. It is formed from Eluru revenue division and Jangareddygudem revenue division from West Godavari district and Nuzvid revenue division from Krishna district.

History 
Eluru District history is shared common history with West Godavari district, The Eastern Chalukyas ruled coastal Andhra from 700 to 1200, with Vengi, near Pedavegi village, as their capital. Historical pieces of evidence are found at the villages, Pedavegi and Guntupalli (Jilakarragudem). Eluru then became a part of the Kalinga Empire until 1471. Later it fell into the hands of the Gajapati Empire. In 1515, Krishnadevaraya captured it. After the fall of the Vijayanagara Empire, it was taken by the Sultan of Golconda Fort, Kutub Shah. On 2 April 2022, Eluru District was formed with Eluru as its headquarters and all the district offices and regional offices were set up in Eluru city, Before that it was a Headquarter for West Godavari district.

Geography 
The district occupies an area of 6,679 km2 (2,578.776 sq mi). The district is bounded by Khammam district & Alluri Sitharama Raju district on the north, West Godavari district & Konnasemma District on the south. The Godavari River separates East Godavari district on east and Tammileru River and Kolleru Lake separates it from Krishna district and NTR district on the west.

Topography

Rivers and waterbodies

Climate 
The region has a tropical climate similar to the rest of the Coastal Andhra region. The summers (March–June) are hot and dry while the winters are fairly cold. The rainy season (July–December) is often the best time for tourist visits, as fields are brilliantly green with paddy crops, rivers flowing with monsoon water, and a relatively cool climate. The region has long been home to the Indian nobles due to its climate and fertile soil, and several zamindar large mansions are scattered around the Godavari area.

Demographics 
At the time of the 2011 census, the district had a population of 20,02,658, of which 384,370 (19.19%) live in urban areas. Eluru district has a sex ratio of 1002 females per 1000 males and a literacy rate of 71.44%. Scheduled Castes and Scheduled Tribes made up 4,38,087 (21.87%) and 1,21,973 (6.09%) of the population respectively.

Administrative divisions 

The district has three revenue divisions, namely Jangareddigudem, Eluru and Nuzividu, each headed by a sub collector. These revenue divisions are divided into 28 mandals. The district consists of one municipal corporation. Eluru city is the only municipal corporation.

Mandals 
There are 10 mandals in Jangareddigudem division, 13 in Eluru division and 6 in Nuzividu division. The 28 mandals under their revenue divisions are listed below:

Cities and towns

Culture and tourism 

There are many landmarks and tourism destinations in the district. Eluru is the largest city of the district with many destinations related to Buddhists and Archeological importance such as Guntupalli Caves near the city. Eluru city hosts a 74-foot high Buddha statue in the heart of the city.Some of the religious destinations include, Dwaraka Tirumala known with the name as Chinna Tirumala,

Education

Politics 
There are one parliamentary and seven assembly constituencies in Eluru district. The parliamentary constituencies are 
The assembly constituencies are

Notable people 

 Sekhar Kammula, film director
 Kurma Venkata Reddy Naidu, Chief Minister of Madras Presidency
 L. V. Prasad,  Indian film producer, actor, director, cinematographer and businessman
 Duvvuri Subbarao, former Reserve Bank Governor

References 

 
Districts of Andhra Pradesh
2022 establishments in Andhra Pradesh